"Day Dreaming" is a soul single by American singer Aretha Franklin. Released from her album Young, Gifted and Black, it spent two weeks at the top of the Hot Soul Singles chart in April 1972 and peaked at number five on the Billboard Hot 100 and number 11 on the Easy Listening singles chart. Billboard ranked it as the No. 61 song for 1972.

Donny Hathaway plays electric piano on the song and Hubert Laws plays the flute. The single version omits the jazzy daydream-like music heard at the beginning and the ending of the track on the album, because the vocals sounded too psychedelic for most radio airplay. It had been rumored the song was about Temptations' singer Dennis Edwards, which was confirmed by Franklin in 1999 on The Oprah Winfrey Show. It would be her twelfth number-one soul single while at Atlantic Records and sold more than one million copies.

Cover versions
The song has been covered by Mary J. Blige, Will Downing, Penny Ford, Michel'le, Corinne Bailey Rae, Tamia, Tweet and Japanese singer Ua. Rapper T.I.'s "Let's Get Away" interpolated the song from 2003's Trap Muzik, which was his final single released from the album. Rapper Cam'Ron interpolated and covered the song in his single "Daydreaming" from Come Home with Me.

On August 1, 2006, American singer Natalie Cole released her version of "Day Dreaming" as a single from her 12th studio album [[Leavin' (album)|Leavin''']]. A video accompanying the song was directed by Doug Biro, and features Cole singing with her band in front of a white background. The cover earned Cole a nomination at the 49th Annual Grammy Awards for Best Female R&B Vocal Performance, but she lost to Mary J. Blige for her 2005 single "Be Without You". Cole said she "added a little bit of a hip-hop feel" to her interpretation of the song. Cole performed "Day Dreaming" at the BET special An Evening of Stars: Tribute to Aretha Franklin'' along with an arrangement of Franklin's 1970 single "Call Me".

References

External links
[ Song review] on Allmusic

1972 singles
Aretha Franklin songs
Songs written by Aretha Franklin
1972 songs
Atlantic Records singles
Song recordings produced by Tom Dowd
Song recordings produced by Arif Mardin
Song recordings produced by Jerry Wexler